Podleś  may refer to:

Places
Mały Podleś
Nowy Podleś
Wielki Podleś
Podleś (PKP station)
Podles, Silistra Province, a village in Glavinitsa Municipality, Bulgaria

People
Ewa Podleś